Lehman is an unincorporated community in Lehman Township, Luzerne County, Pennsylvania, United States. Lehman has a post office with ZIP code 18627, which opened on January 18, 1826.

References

Unincorporated communities in Luzerne County, Pennsylvania
Unincorporated communities in Pennsylvania